Francisco Sebastián Córdova Reyes (born 12 June 1997) is a Mexican professional footballer who plays as a midfielder for Liga MX club Tigres UANL and the Mexico national team.

Club career
Born in Aguascalientes, Córdova joined the youth academy of Club América in 2015. He spent 2016 on loan with Ascenso MX side Alebrijes de Oaxaca, only managing two appearances between league and Copa MX, totaling 21 minutes of action; in his sole Ascenso MX appearance, Córdova came on as an 85th-minute substitute against Murciélagos in Oaxaca's 4–1 victory. He played 16 minutes in Oaxaca's scoreless draw against the same opposition in the Copa MX. Following the loan spell, Córdova returned to Club América's youth side.

In 2018, Córdova joined Necaxa on loan, with whom he made his competitive debut in the Supercopa MX victory over Monterrey, scoring the game's only goal. He made his Liga MX debut on 14 August against Lobos BUAP.

Córdova returned to América prior to the start of the 2019 Clausura, and scored twice in seven league matches during the tournament. On 29 September, he scored a brace in América's 4–1 Apertura victory over rivals Guadalajara. In the first-leg of the Apertura finals against Monterrey, following review by the video assistant referee, Córdova was sent-off in the 53rd minute due to a late challenge on Leonel Vangioni. He missed the second-leg as América finished runners-up.

Prior to the start of the 2021–22 season, Córdova was given the number 10 jersey, the first canterano (home-grown) player to wear it since Cuauhtémoc Blanco.

International career

Youth
Córdova was called up by Marco Antonio Ruiz to the under-20 team competing in the 2017 CONCACAF U-20 Championship.

Córdova was included in the under-21 roster that participated in the 2018 Toulon Tournament, where Mexico would finish runners-up. He also featured for the side at the Central American and Caribbean Games that same year. In May of the following year, Cordóva was once again included in the squad participating in that year's edition of the Toulon Tournament, this time with the under-22 side coached by Jaime Lozano. In the semifinal against Japan, Mexico lost 5–4 on penalties following a two-goal draw after 90 minutes; Córdova played the entirety of the match and scored in the shootout. He was an unused substitute in Mexico's 4–3 penalty shootout win in the third-place match over the Republic of Ireland.

Córdova was a part of the squad which won the delayed 2020 CONCACAF Olympic Qualifying Championship, scoring four goals (including a hat-trick against the Dominican Republic) in as many appearances to finish as the competition's top scorer and was included in the tournament's Best XI. He was subsequently called up to participate in the 2020 Summer Olympics. Córdova won the bronze medal with the Olympic team.

Senior
On 2 October 2019, Córdova earned his first cap with the senior national team in a friendly match against Trinidad and Tobago. The following month, he scored his first goal with Mexico in their Nations League match against Bermuda, the first in the team's 2–1 win.

Career statistics

Club

International

International goals
Scores and results list Mexico's goal tally first.

Honours
Necaxa
Supercopa MX: 2018

América
Copa MX: Clausura 2019
Campeón de Campeones: 2019

Mexico U23
CONCACAF Olympic Qualifying Championship: 2020
Olympic Bronze Medal: 2020

Individual
CONCACAF Olympic Qualifying Championship Golden Boot: 2020
CONCACAF Olympic Qualifying Championship Best XI: 2020

References

External links
 
  
 

1997 births
Living people
Mexican footballers
Mexico international footballers
Association football midfielders
Club América footballers
Alebrijes de Oaxaca players
Club Necaxa footballers
Liga MX players
Ascenso MX players
Liga Premier de México players
Footballers from Aguascalientes
People from Aguascalientes City
Mexico under-20 international footballers
Footballers at the 2020 Summer Olympics
Olympic footballers of Mexico
Olympic medalists in football
Olympic bronze medalists for Mexico
Medalists at the 2020 Summer Olympics